Hardin County is a county located in the U.S. state of Iowa. As of the 2020 census, the population was 16,878. The county seat is Eldora. The county was named in honor of Col. John J. Hardin, of Illinois, who was killed in the Mexican–American War.

History
Hardin County was formed in 1851. It was named after Colonel John J. Hardin, who died in the Mexican–American War.

In its history the county has had three courthouses. The first was a small wood-framed building, which burned down in the 1850s.  The second courthouse was a two-story building and stood on the site of the current office of the county sheriff.  The third and present courthouse was constructed in 1892 and opened on September 19, 1893.  The structure was listed on the National Register of Historic Places in 1981.

Hardin County, along with Story County, was also a primary filming location for the 1996 movie Twister, starring Bill Paxton and Helen Hunt.

Geography

Major highways
 U.S. Highway 20
 U.S. Highway 65
 Iowa Highway 57
 Iowa Highway 175

Adjacent counties
Franklin County  (north)
Butler County  (northeast)
Grundy County  (east)
Marshall County  (southeast)
Story County  (southwest)
Hamilton County  (west)
Wright County, Iowa (northwest)

Demographics

2020 census
There were 8,032 housing units, of which 7,070 were occupied.

2010 census
There were 8,224 housing units, of which 7,296 were occupied.

2000 census

As of the census of 2000, there were 18,812 people, 7,628 households, and 5,087 families residing in the county.  The population density was 33 people per square mile (13/km2).  There were 8,318 housing units at an average density of 15 per square mile (6/km2).  The racial makeup of the county was 97.14% White, 0.62% Black or African American, 0.13% Native American, 0.32% Asian, 0.05% Pacific Islander, 1.24% from other races, and 0.50% from two or more races.  2.42% of the population were Hispanic or Latino of any race.

There were 7,628 households, out of which 29.50% had children under the age of 18 living with them, 57.10% were married couples living together, 6.50% had a female householder with no husband present, and 33.30% were non-families. 29.40% of all households were made up of individuals, and 15.70% had someone living alone who was 65 years of age or older.  The average household size was 2.35 and the average family size was 2.91.

In the county, the population was spread out, with 24.70% under the age of 18, 8.40% from 18 to 24, 23.80% from 25 to 44, 22.40% from 45 to 64, and 20.70% who were 65 years of age or older.  The median age was 41 years. For every 100 females there were 95.70 males.  For every 100 females age 18 and over, there were 90.10 males.

The median income for a household in the county was $35,429, and the median income for a family was $41,891. Males had a median income of $30,515 versus $21,068 for females. The per capita income for the county was $17,537.  About 5.50% of families and 8.00% of the population were below the poverty line, including 9.90% of those under age 18 and 6.20% of those age 65 or over.

Communities

Cities

Ackley
Alden
Buckeye
Eldora
Hubbard
Iowa Falls
New Providence
Owasa
Radcliffe
Steamboat Rock
Union
Whitten

Census-designated place
Garden City

Other unincorporated communities
Cleves
Gifford

Townships

Alden
Buckeye
Clay
Concord
Eldora
Ellis
Etna
Grant
Hardin
Jackson
Pleasant
Providence
Sherman
Tipton
Union

Population ranking
The population ranking of the following table is based on the 2020 census of Hardin County.

† county seat

Politics
For most of its history, Hardin County has primarily supported the Republican Party in presidential elections, with only five of the party's candidates failing to win the county in the period from 1880 to 1984. The only Democrat since 1996 to win the county has been Barack Obama in 2008, winning by only 78 votes.

See also

Homer D. Calkins
Ellsworth Community College
Folkert Mound Group
National Register of Historic Places listings in Hardin County, Iowa
Hardin County Courthouse

References

External links

Official Website of Hardin County
Hardin County Development Council's website
Welcome to Hardin County, Iowa, a National Park Service Discover Our Shared Heritage Travel Itinerary

 
1851 establishments in Iowa
Populated places established in 1851